Siena Liggins (born April 27, 1994) is an Atlanta-based pop musician.

Early life 
Born in Michigan, Liggins grew up in a military family and lived in multiple states throughout her youth. As a child in North Carolina, she was in the Martin Luther King Jr. All Children’s Choir at her mother's demands. Although she did not enjoy the choir, she learned how to read sheet music there. Her uncle, a rapper, had a home studio in her grandmother's basement, which he let Liggins use to record her own track in middle school. Liggins continued to write music in her spare time. After returning to Michigan for the end of high school, Liggins studied at the Detroit Institute of Music Education and started but did not finish college at NYU Steinhardt, as she decided to pursue music full time.

Career
Liggins began writing for artists at Assemble Sound, a Detroit-based development hub for independent musicians, and was eventually noticed by enough producers to release her debut single, "Flowerbomb". Like much of her music, "Flowerbomb" references a real situation Liggins experienced.

Following her debut, Liggins toured supporting Flint Eastwood. Liggins continues to release music with Assemble Sound, including using their space to build sets for her music videos. Her music, usually themed around her romantic or sexual relationships with women, is often featured on Billboard Pride.

In April 2021, Liggins released her debut album, Ms. Out Tonight. Liggins stated she released Ms. Out Tonight as a visual album "in order to really drive the point home: it's beyond time to disrupt the norms and there's room in the pop space for all of us."

Liggins moved from Detroit to Atlanta in 2021.

Artistry

Influences
Liggins is inspired by TLC, Usher and Britney Spears.

Style
Liggins strives to make her music "provocative, but beautiful". Her music generally combines "cocky" lyrics with a soft voice and playful production.

Personal life
Liggins is a lesbian.

Discography

Albums

Singles

References 

American women pop singers
American women singer-songwriters
LGBT African Americans
21st-century American women singers
American lesbian musicians
American LGBT singers
Living people
1994 births
21st-century American singers
20th-century LGBT people
21st-century LGBT people
African-American women musicians
21st-century African-American women singers
Singer-songwriters from Michigan